Journal of a Contract Killer is a 2008 film directed by Tony Maylam.

Plot

Stephanie Komack was a big-class hooker and assassin for the Italian Mob. She now was working in London as a waitress, and a single mother to her seven-year-old daughter, the Mob tracks Stephanie down and persuade her to do one final job. That when the hit goes wrong and Stephanie soon realises the  reality of her failure. They snatch her daughter as punishment, but didn't figure on Stephanie's capacity for revenge. Inspired by true events.

References

External links
 

American films about revenge
Films about contract killing
2008 crime drama films
2008 films
2000s English-language films
2000s American films